Dryophiops is a genus of snakes of the family Colubridae.

Both species in this genus are found in Southeast Asia, with D. philippina being found in the Philippines and D. rubescens being found in mainland Southeast Asia and Indonesia.

Species (whip snakes)
 Dryophiops philippina Boulenger, 1896
 Dryophiops rubescens (Gray, 1835)

References

Dryophiops
Snake genera